Best Of The Videos is a DVD featuring music videos by Def Leppard. This one-disc collection contains a total of 33 commercial single videos that helped jump the band to success after the release of their breakthrough 1983 album, Pyromania. The "Bringin' On the Heartbreak" video featured on the compilation, is the 1984 version.

This DVD collection was released alongside its own compilation CD album, which included various songs that were not released as singles and singles that did not have music videos made for them.  These videos also contain 5.1 Surround mixes, as well as Stereo audio options.

Track listing
 "Photograph"
 "Rock of Ages"
 "Foolin'"
 "Bringin' On the Heartbreak" (2nd Version with Phil Collen)
 "Animal"
 "Women"
 "Pour Some Sugar on Me" (U.S. Version)
 "Armageddon It"
 "Hysteria"
 "Love Bites"
 "Rocket"
 "Let's Get Rocked"
 "Make Love Like a Man"
 "Heaven Is"
 "Have You Ever Needed Someone So Bad"
 "Stand Up (Kick Love into Motion)"
 "Tonight"
 "I Wanna Touch U"
 "Two Steps Behind"
 "Miss You In A Heartbeat"
 "Action"
 "When Love & Hate Collide" (4 minutes condensed "Epic" Version)
 "Slang"
 "Work It Out"
 "All I Want Is Everything"
 "Promises"
 "Goodbye"
 "Now"
 "Long, Long Way to Go"

Extra features
There are 3 alternate versions of videos are access when a Def Leppard-style angular 'D' appears in the top right-hand side of the screen and the 'Play' button is pressed.

 "Armageddon It" Alternate version
 "When Love & Hate Collide" (8 "Epic" Version)
 "Slang" Director's Cut (Audio track is slightly sped up)

Additional information
 The video for "Bringin' On the Heartbreak" is the Phil Collen version (taped in 1984), however, the audio is the original Pete Willis version (1981).
 The "mouse scene" at the end of "Long, Long Way to Go" is removed on this DVD.

Def Leppard video albums
2004 video albums
Music video compilation albums
2004 compilation albums
Def Leppard compilation albums